Svobodny (ICAO: UHBS) is an airport in Amur Oblast, Russia located 11 km north of Svobodny. It is a small general aviation airport. The field elevation is 600 feet.

Reference 

Airports built in the Soviet Union
Airports in Amur Oblast